The Diocese of Ciudad Valles is a Latin Church ecclesiastical territory diocese of the Catholic Church in Mexico. The diocese was erected on 27 November 1960. It is a suffragan in the ecclesiastical province of the metropolitan Archdiocese of San Luis Potosí. It was a suffragan of the Archdiocese of Monterrey until 25 November 2006. It cathedra is found within the Cathedral of Our Lady of Guadalupe in the episcopal see of Ciudad Valles, San Luis Potosí.

Bishops

Ordinaries
Carlos Quintero Arce (1961 - 1966)
Alfonso Reyes Ramos (1966 - 1969)
José Melgoza Osorio (1970 - 1979)
Juvencio González Alvarez (1980 - 1995)
José Guadalupe Galván Galindo (1994 - 2000)
Roberto Octavio Balmori Cinta, M.J. (2002 - 2020)
Roberto Yenny García (2020 - present)

Other priest of this diocese who became bishop
Héctor Luis Morales Sánchez, appointed Prelate of Huautla, Oaxaca in 2005

Territorial losses

External links and references

Ciudad Valles
Ciudad Valles, Roman Catholic Diocese of
Ciudad Valles
Ciudad Valles
1960 establishments in Mexico